"Strings of Life" is a 1987 song by American electronic musician Derrick May, in collaboration with Michael James, and released under the name Rhythim Is Rhythim. It is his most well-known song and considered a classic in both the house music and techno genres. May is credited with developing the futuristic variation that would be dubbed "techno". LA Weekly ranked it number-one in their list of "The 20 Best Dance Music Tracks in History" in 2015.

Background and release
Born in Detroit, May began exploring electronic music at early age. His high school friends were Juan Atkins and Kevin Saunderson. They were commonly known as the Belleville Three.

In 1987, May started his production career with the release of "Nude Photo", a single co-written by Thomas Barnett. The single helped kickstart the Detroit techno music scene. A year later he followed it with the release of "Strings of Life," which was named by Frankie Knuckles. It "hit Britain in an especially big way during the country's 1987-1988 house explosion."

"Strings of Life" is based on a piano sequence by May's friend Michael James. He dropped in for a visit at May's house and sat down to play a piano ballad he had been working on called, "Lightning Strikes Twice". This piece went into Derrick's sequencer and was kept there until Derrick decided to listen to it all the way through. He found some portions which interested him, and he started to work with it. The song was originally at 80 BPM before May increased the tempo, chopped it up into loops, and added percussion and string samples.

According to Frankie Knuckles, the track "just exploded. It was like something you can't imagine, the kind of power and energy people got off that record when it was first heard. Mike Dunn says he has no idea how people can accept a record that doesn't have a bassline."

In 1989, the song was remixed by Juan Atkins and released as "Strings of Life '89". It peaked at number 74 in the United Kingdom.

Impact and legacy

Through the years, many DJs has picked "Strings of Life" as one of their favourite songs. American DJ Pierre said to Music Week, "This is the ultimate strings song. The arrangement is brilliant and has a piano string breakdown which established the breakdown that many people use today. It was one of the first songs to put percussion to the forefront." American DJ Carl Craig commented, "I got this when it came out in 1988. It's a great party record. Spiritually, I don't know whether it would have anything for me at home but, when I hear it at a club, I trip out." English house music DJ, DJ Paulette told, "I love this because of the moment when the piano comes in — it's like watching the sun rising. I play both mixes, but for playing clubs I like this one [the Ashley Beedle Mix] because of the beat." 
 

In 1996, clubbing magazine Mixmag ranked the song number 17 on its "100 Greatest Dance Singles of All Time" list.

In 1997, American songwriter, record producer, DJ and singer Robert Owens featured "Strings of Life" in his all-time top 10 list. He explained, "Derrick May takes me back to the Music Box days and the type of people that went ouf during that period. It's good to remember your roots and nice to pull something out to remind you. This is an all-time classic. I play it anywhere. The remixes came out and kinda killed it, so l put it away for six months. But it will always resurface."

In 1998, DJ Magazine ranked it number 25 on their list of "Top 100 Club Tunes".

BBC Radio's 2008 listeners & DJs poll, "The Greatest Ever Dance Record", ranked "Strings of Life" number four, after Michael Jackson's "Billie Jean", James Brown's "Sex Machine" and Donna Summer's "I Feel Love".

In 2011, The Guardian featured the song on their "A History of Modern Music: Dance".

In 2013, Mixmag ranked it number 28 on their list of "50 Greatest Dance Tracks of All Time".

In 2014, Complex included it on their list of "Songs Every Dance Music Fan Should Know, Vol. 1", noting, "It's amazing that a record that encapsulates piano and orchestral samples but has no bassline (or need for one) can still resonate today."

In 2015, LA Weekly ranked it number one on its "The 20 Best EDM and Dance Music Tracks in History", while Time Outs 2015 list of "The 20 Best House Tracks Ever" included it at number 12.

In 2022, Rolling Stone placed "Strings of Life" number 33 in their list of "200 Greatest Dance Songs of All Time".

Track listings
 12-inch single, US (1987)"Strings" (Flam-Boy-Ant Mix) – 6:54
"Strings of Life" – 7:23
"Move It" (Remix) – 5:42
"Kaos" (Juice Bar Mix) – 5:50                   
"Untitled" – 3:08

 12-inch single ('89 Remix), UK (1989)"Strings of Life '89" (Juan's Magic Mix)
"Strings of Life" (Original Version)
"Nude Photo"

Charts

Soul Central version

British House music duo Soul Central covered the song and released it in January 2005 with the subtitle "Stronger on My Own'". Vocals were written for this version by Paul Timothy and Jaquie Williams that were provided by American house singer Kathy Brown. The cover reached number six on the UK Singles Chart the week after its release and became a club hit, peaking atop the UK Dance Chart. It additionally reached the top 50 in Australia, Flanders, Ireland, and the Netherlands.

Charts

Weekly charts

Year-end charts

Other covers
British electronic artist Kieran Hebden and American jazz drummer Steve Reid covered the song during their improvisational performances in the late 2000s, a live version being released after Reid's passing to raise funds for a foundation started in his name.

References

1987 singles
1987 songs
1989 singles
2005 singles
American house music songs
British house music songs
Electro songs
Techno songs